Bonis Hall is a former country house to the north of Prestbury, Cheshire, England.  It was the seat of the Pigot family until 1746, when it was bought by Charles Legh of Adlington.  In the early part of the 19th century it was remodelled and used by the Legh family as a dower house. In the early 20th century the exterior was pebbledashed, and castellations were added
  
The Duke of York (later King  George VI) occasionally stayed at Bonis Hall with its owner Sir Robert Burrows.

It has since been converted for use as offices.  It is constructed in brick, with Kerridge stone-slate roofs.  The house is in two storeys and has a seven-bay front with coped gables surmounted by ball and urn finials. On top of the building is a square tower with a pyramidal roof surmounted by a hexagonal bellcote with a copper cupola and weathervane.  It is recorded in the National Heritage List for England as a designated Grade II listed building.

See also

Listed buildings in Prestbury, Cheshire

References

Country houses in Cheshire
Grade II listed buildings in Cheshire